John Edie (1856 – 7 June 1928) was a Liberal Party Member of Parliament in the Otago region of New Zealand. He was a surveyor and an engineer, and also spent time as a farmer. He was Mayor of Lawrence.

Early life
Edie was born in Newcastle, New South Wales in 1856. He came to New Zealand as a child and attended school in Waitahuna near Lawrence. He joined the survey department in 1873 and surveyed the Catlins River Branch railway line, but construction did not start until 1879. In 1876, at age 20, he became assistant surveyor to the Government.

Political career

Before the election, he was criticised for standing for the Liberal Party, thus claiming to represent the working man, yet underpaying staff at his mine. He was soundly beaten by the conservative incumbent, James Thomson.

Edie contested the  electorate in the 1919 election as a Liberal against the incumbent, Reform's James Allen. Edie was beaten by the small margin of 126 votes (2.15%). At the time of the election, he was Mayor of Lawrence.

In the 1922 general election he won the Clutha electorate, but lost Clutha in 1925 to the Reform candidate Fred Waite.

Later life and death
Edie was for a time captain of the Tuapeka Rifles. He was into mining, especially gold mining, and had an interest in a mine at Island Block (a locality on State Highway 8 between Beaumont and Ettrick).

Edie died on 7 June 1928 at Lawrence after having been bed-ridden with heart problems for six months.

Notes

References

1856 births
1928 deaths
New Zealand Liberal Party MPs
New Zealand surveyors
New Zealand civil engineers
Mayors of places in Otago
Unsuccessful candidates in the 1896 New Zealand general election
Unsuccessful candidates in the 1919 New Zealand general election
Unsuccessful candidates in the 1925 New Zealand general election
Members of the New Zealand House of Representatives
New Zealand MPs for South Island electorates
19th-century New Zealand politicians
19th-century New Zealand engineers